"Anapandites Kliseis" (Unanswered calls) is the first single from Helena Paparizou as a solo singer. It was released on 28 December 2003, and followed by Paparizou's first solo album, Protereotita, in June 2004. The song was written by Christos Dantis and Vangelis Konstantinidis. The CD single was certified Gold in Greece.

The SMS Remix of the song was released as a promotional single and included with issues of Celebrity Magazine.

Paparizou performed a new version of the song, featuring Christos Dantis, for MAD TV's MAD Video Music Awards.

Music video
In the music video for "Anapandites Kliseis", Paparizou is in a club with a number of other people, all dancing. She is seen dancing and singing multiple times throughout the video. She is calling someone but cannot get an answer. A music video for the album's "Treli Kardia" was also made.

Track listing
CD single
"Anapantites Kliseis" – 4:07
"Treli Kardia" – 3:31
"Brosta Ston Kathrefti" – 3:22

Promo single
"Anapandites Kliseis" (SMS Remix) – 6:41

Charts and certifications

References

2003 debut singles
2003 songs
Helena Paparizou songs
Number-one singles in Greece
Songs written by Christos Dantis
Greek-language songs